Kiel Kenneth Moe (born 1976). is a registered practicing American architect. Moe has taught architecture and energy at University of Illinois at Chicago, Syracuse University, Northeastern University and Harvard Graduate School of Design. He holds the Gerald Sheff Chair of Architecture in McGill University.

Moe received the B.Arch from the University of Cincinnati, M.Arch from University of Virginia, and a Master in Design and Environmental Studies from the Harvard Graduate School of Design Advanced Studies Program.

Honors and awards
2012, 2014, 2016 Fellow, MacDowell Colony for the Arts

2013 Boston Design Biennial winner by Boston Society of Architects

2012 Barbara and Andrew Senchak Fellowship, The MacDowell Colony

2011 Architectural League Prize by Architectural League of New York   

2011 Young Architects Award American Institute of Architects  

2010 Fellow of  American Academy in Rome (FAAR)

Books 

 Unless: The Seagram Building Construction Ecology; Actar Publishers; New York, Barcelona (2020)
 Empire, State & Building; Actar Publishers; New York, Barcelona (2017)
 Insulating modernism: isolated and non-isolated thermodynamics in architecture, Basel, Switzerland ; Boston : Birkhäuser, (2014)
 Convergence: Architectural Agenda for Energy, Routledge, Taylor & Francis Group.,  (2013)
 Building Systems: Technology, Design, & Society,Abingdon, Oxon [England] ; New York, NY : Routledge (2012)
 Thermally Active Surfaces in Architecture (2010)
 Integrated Design in Contemporary Architecture, Princeton Architectural Press (2008)

References

External links 
Kiel Moe's CV in Harvard University

Living people
1976 births
American architects
University of Cincinnati alumni
University of Illinois Chicago faculty
Harvard Graduate School of Design alumni
Fulbright Distinguished Chairs
University of Virginia School of Architecture alumni